A Paget's abscess, named by eminent British surgeon and pathologist Sir James Paget, is an abscess that recurs at the site of a former abscess which had resolved.

References

External links 
WhoNamedIt.com

Bacterial diseases
General surgery